Edgar Pomeroy "Smiley" Weltner (February 9, 1896 – April 4, 1992) was an American football and basketball player and coach. Weltner coached at high school, college, and professional levels during his career.

Playing career
Weltner entered college at Ohio State University where he played on the football and basketball teams, graduating in 1920.

Coaching career

Geneva
Weltner was the 18th head football coach at Geneva College in Beaver Falls, Pennsylvania and he held that position for missing seasons, from 1937 until 1940. His coaching record at Geneva was 16–19–2. Weltner resigned after the 1940 football season, citing his own disappointment in the record of the team. Weltner also was the basketball coach at Geneva during his tenure. After he resigned as football coach, he also discontinued his work as the basketball coach.

High school coaching
Prior to coaching at Geneva, Weltner spent some time coaching in the high school ranks, including two years at Fostoria High School in Fostoria, Ohio and another period of time at Akron South High Schoolin Akron, Ohio, leading the South High Cavaliers to two state championships.

Professional coaching
Weltner was head coach of the Akron Goodyear Wingfoots professional basketball team in the Midwest Basketball Conference from 1932 to 1936.

References

External links
 

1896 births
1992 deaths
American men's basketball players
Akron Goodyear Wingfoots coaches
Geneva Golden Tornadoes football coaches
Geneva Golden Tornadoes men's basketball coaches
Ohio State Buckeyes men's basketball players
High school football coaches in Ohio
People from Columbiana County, Ohio
Coaches of American football from Ohio
Basketball coaches from Ohio
Basketball players from Ohio